Ciril Bergles (18 July 1934 – 25 August 2013) was a Slovene poet, essayist and translator. He published numerous collections of poetry and was also known for his translations of poetry, mostly by Spanish and South American authors, into Slovene.

Bergles was born in Repče, just outside Ljubljana in 1934. He studied Slovene and English at the University of Ljubljana and worked as a secondary school teacher after graduation. He started publishing his poetry in 1984 with his collection Na poti v tišino (On the Path to Silence). In 2004 he won the Jenko Award for his poetry collection Moj dnevnik priča (My Diary Speaks). He translated poetry by Jorge Guillén, Alejandra Pizarnik, Jaime Gil de Biedma, Adrienne Rich, Fernando Pessoa, Luis Cernuda, Justo Jorge Padrón, Miguel de Unamuno, Constantine Cavafy, Rubén Darío, Ernesto Cardenal, Rafael Alberti, Federico García Lorca and César Vallejo into Slovene. He also published an anthology of Basque poets in Slovene entitled  Branil bom očetovo hišo (I Will Defend My Father's House).

Poetry collections
 Tutankamon (2008)
 Zaupna sporočila (2008)
 Tvoja roka na mojem čelu (2006)
 Moj dnevnik priča (2004)
 V Polifemovem očesu (2004)
 Z besedo in ognjem (1999)
 Čas darovanja (1999)
 Razsežnost prosojnosti (1996)
 Noč, nato še dan (1996)
 Via Dolorosa (1996)
 Ifrikija (1993)
 Ta dom je večen (1991)
 Pesnik v Benetkah (1990)
 Ellis Island (1998)
 Vaje za svetlobo (1985)
 Na poti v tišino (1984)

References

Slovenian poets
Slovenian male poets
Slovenian translators
2013 deaths
1934 births
University of Ljubljana alumni
20th-century poets
20th-century translators
People from the City Municipality of Ljubljana